William Kidd (31 January 1908 – 1978) was a professional footballer who played for Chesterfield for the whole of his professional career. He was born in Pegswood.

External links
article
Official Chesterfield F.C. History

References
Football League Players Records 1888–1939 – Michael Joyce

1908 births
1978 deaths
Association football defenders
Chesterfield F.C. players
Huddersfield Town A.F.C. wartime guest players
English footballers
People from Pegswood
Footballers from Northumberland